The Real Feel is the 2009 debut solo album from Spiral Stairs (formerly of Pavement and Preston School of Industry).

Reception

The Real Feel received mixed reviews from critics. On Metacritic, the album holds a score of 57 out of 100 based on 15 reviews, indicating "mixed or average reviews".

Track listing
 True Love 			
 Call The Ceasefire 			
 Cold Change 			
 Subiaco Shuffle 			
 Wharf Hand Blues 			
 Maltese T 			
 A Mighty Mighty Fall 			
 Stolen Pills 			
 The Real Feel 			
 Blood Money 			
 Ladies and Gentlemen

References

2009 debut albums
Spiral Stairs albums
Matador Records albums